Creighton is an unincorporated community in East Deer Township, Allegheny County, Pennsylvania, United States; it is located in western Pennsylvania within the Pittsburgh Metropolitan Statistical Area, approximately  northeast of Pittsburgh. Creighton is situated along the Allegheny River at Pool 3. The latitude of Creighton is 40.587N, while the longitude is -79.778W. Creighton appears on the New Kensington West U.S. Geological Survey Map.

The Pittsburgh Plate Glass Company was founded in Creighton; its first plant was opened along the river in 1883.

References

Pittsburgh metropolitan area
Unincorporated communities in Allegheny County, Pennsylvania
Unincorporated communities in Pennsylvania